Jimmie Strimell (born 3 December 1980) is a Swedish singer and composer. He was the founding member, vocalist and main composer of Dead by April until March 2013.

Strimell rejoined Dead by April in April 2017 shortly after Christoffer Andersson's departure from the band. In March 2020, he was released from the band for a second time due to his ongoing drug and alcohol addiction.

After being released from Dead by April for the second time, Strimell went out to form a new band called Vindicta.
Vindicta released their first single called "Slice It" on October 1st, 2021.

Discography  
with Nightrage
 2007 — A New Disease Is Born

with Dead by April
 2009 — Dead by April
 2011 — Incomparable

with Death Destruction
 2011 — Death Destruction

with Ends With a Bullet
 2013 — Ends With a Bullet (EP)

with My Collapse
 2015 — Ghosts (Single)

with Splittrad
 2018 — Djofull (Single)
 2018 — Jörmungandr (Single)

with Vindicta
 2021 — Slice It (Single)

References 

1980 births
Living people
People from Gothenburg
Swedish heavy metal singers
21st-century Swedish singers
21st-century guitarists
Melodifestivalen contestants of 2012